The Collaboration is a 2016 Chinese and South Korean collaboration television program focused on creating a collaboration between Korean and Chinese artists. It airs simultaneously in China on Tencent and in South Korea on SBS MTV every other Thursday at 8:00 pm (CST) and 9:00 pm (KST). It is co-created by Peng Xun and SBS for the 24th anniversary of the China-South Korea relations. Season 2 (The Collaboration Season 2) takes place in 2018

Contents

The Collaboration is essentially a variety show focused on creating a collaboration between Korean and Chinese artists on music, composition and performance. A survival/competition show where 4 teams will be formed and songs composed will be voted on.

Between episode 2 and 9, there will be voting from netizens to pair the participants for collaboration. The song that receives the most votes in recording room in each episode will go to the final round. The song that receives the most votes from both recording room and online in the final round will win.

There will be 4 teams. Each team will have 1 participant from Korea and 1 from China.

Participants

Episodes

 Joker Xue - Actor
 Wang Yue Xin - Do You Understand?
 Hu Xia - Those Years
 Yu Tian - There's A Power Named As Fool Power
 Jay Park - I Like To Party, Mommae
 Mino - Fear, I'm Him
 Zico - Veni Vidi Vici, Turtle Ship
 Seungyoon - Wild & Young, It Rains

Pairs were made based on the glasses each of them chose.

References

2016 South Korean television series debuts
Korean-language television shows
Chinese-language television shows
Seoul Broadcasting System original programming
South Korean variety television shows